Sir Kaneh or Sirkaneh may refer to:
 Sir Kaneh, Ilam
 Sir Kaneh, Kermanshah
 Sirkaneh, Lorestan Province